Dan Haluptzok is an American curler.

Teams

Private life
He is from family of curlers. His father, mother and younger brother Mark are curlers too. Dan played with Mark in three World championships (1979, 1993, 1994).

References

External links
 
 Club History – Bemidji Curling Club (find "Dan Haluptzok")

Living people
People from Bemidji, Minnesota
Sportspeople from Minnesota
American male curlers
American curling champions
Year of birth missing (living people)